Nuder may refer to:
 Pär Nuder, Swedish politician
 Nuder, Iran (disambiguation), places in Iran